The ancestors of present-day Memons who settled a few centuries ago in various parts of the districts of India, particularly Kathiawar (now Saurashtra), commonly identified as simply Memons.

The language of Kathiawadi Memons is Memon, sometimes called Memoni.

The South African Memon community is largely descended from Memons who emigrated from Kathiawar in the early twentieth century.

See also
Memon (disambiguation)

References 

Social groups of Pakistan
 
Muslim communities of Gujarat